James Sproat Green (July 21, 1792 – November 8, 1862) was an American lawyer who served as U.S. Attorney for the District of New Jersey from 1835 to 1850. He was the father of New Jersey Governor Robert Stockton Green.

Biography

Green was born in Philadelphia, Pennsylvania in 1792, the son of Ashbel Green and Elizabeth (Stockton) Green. His father was Chaplain of the United States House of Representatives from 1792 to 1800 and President of Princeton University from 1812 to 1822. He graduated from Dickinson College in 1811. He was admitted to the New Jersey bar in 1817, as counsellor in 1821, and as sergeant in 1834.

In 1835, Green was appointed U.S. Attorney for the District of New Jersey by President Andrew Jackson. He continued to serve until 1850.

In 1844, he was nominated by President John Tyler to be Secretary of the Treasury, but the nomination was not confirmed by the Senate.

He was a trustee of the College of New Jersey (later Princeton University) from 1828 to 1862. In 1847, when Princeton Law School was founded, Green was named professor of jurisprudence on a faculty that also included Joseph Coerten Hornblower
and Richard Stockton Field. He held the professorship until 1855.

Children
He married Isabella Williamson McCulloh (1792–1865) on January 25, 1825. They had five children:

 Judge Ashbel Green (1825–1898) who was a co-founder of the New York bar association
 Anna McCulloh Green (1827-1917)
 James Sproat Green (1829–1892)
 Robert Stockton Green (1831–1895), Governor of New Jersey
 Isabella Green (1834–1906)

Green died in Princeton in 1862.

See also
Unsuccessful nominations to the Cabinet of the United States

References

|-

1792 births
1862 deaths
19th-century American lawyers
Dickinson College alumni
Lawyers from Philadelphia
People from Princeton, New Jersey
Princeton University faculty
Rejected or withdrawn nominees to the United States Executive Cabinet
United States Attorneys for the District of New Jersey